Ali Gutda Gökdemir (born 17 September 1991) is a former professional footballer who played as a defender. Born in Germany, he represented Azerbaijan at international level.

Club career
Gökdemir played club football in Germany for Hannover 96 II. For the second half of the 2013–14 season he was on loan to Süper Lig side Elazığspor.

In July 2014, Gökdemir moved to Azerbaijan Premier League side Simurq. Despite having had a contract with Hannover until 2015, he was released without a transfer fee.

International career
Gökdemir made his international debut for Azerbaijan in 2012, and appeared in FIFA World Cup qualifying matches. He also played for Azerbaijan U21.

Personal life
Gökdemir is of Turkish descent. Gökdemir retired from football in December 2015 due family reasons.

Career statistics

Club

International

References

1991 births
Living people
People from Schwäbisch Hall
Sportspeople from Stuttgart (region)
Azerbaijani people of Turkish descent
German people of Turkish descent
Azerbaijani footballers
Footballers from Baden-Württemberg
Association football defenders
Azerbaijan international footballers
Azerbaijan under-21 international footballers
German footballers
Regionalliga players
Süper Lig players
Azerbaijan Premier League players
Hannover 96 players
Hannover 96 II players
Elazığspor footballers
Simurq PIK players
German expatriate footballers
Azerbaijani expatriate footballers
Azerbaijani expatriate sportspeople in Turkey
German expatriate sportspeople in Turkey
Expatriate footballers in Turkey